Oh Lucy! May refer to:

 Oh Lucy! (2014 film), a short film
 Oh Lucy! (2017 film), based on the 2014 film